Cv Inhaúma (V-30)  was the lead ship of the  of the Brazilian Navy.

Construction and career
The ship was built at Naval Arsenal Rio de Janeiro in Rio de Janeiro and was launched on 13 December 1986 and commissioned on 12 December 1989.

She was decommissioned on 25 November 2016.

On June 18, 2019, Inhaúma was sunk as target during a Brazilian Navy missile test exercise, having been hit by an AGM-119 Penguin anti-ship missile launched from an SH-helicopter. 16 Seahawk, as well as other bombs used against it during this exercise.

Gallery

References

External links

Ships built in Brazil
Inhaúma-class corvettes
1986 ships